This is a list of the bird species recorded in Belize. Belize includes around 450 smaller cays and islands lying in the Caribbean Sea in addition to the mainland. The avifauna of Belize included a total of 618 species as of February 2023, according to Bird Checklists of the World. Of the 618, 99 are rare or accidental and four have been introduced. None are endemic to the country.

This list is presented in the taxonomic sequence of the Check-list of North and Middle American Birds, 7th edition through the 63rd Supplement, published by the American Ornithological Society (AOS). Common and scientific names are also those of the Check-list, except that the common names of families are from the Clements taxonomy because the AOS list does not include them.

Unless otherwise noted, the species on this list are considered to occur regularly in Belize as permanent residents, summer or winter visitors, or migrants. The following tags have been used to highlight several categories. The tags and notes of population status are from Bird Checklists of the World.

 (A) Accidental - a species that rarely or accidentally occurs in Belize
 (I) Introduced - a species introduced to Belize as a consequence, direct or indirect, of human actions

Tinamous
Order: TinamiformesFamily: Tinamidae

The tinamous are one of the most ancient groups of bird. Although they look similar to other ground-dwelling birds like quail and grouse, they have no close relatives and are classified as a single family, Tinamidae, within their own order, the Tinamiformes. They are distantly related to the ratites (order Struthioniformes), that includes the rheas, emus, and kiwis.

 Great tinamou, Tinamus major (Near-threatened)
 Little tinamou, Crypturellus soui
 Slaty-breasted tinamou, Crypturellus boucardi
 Thicket tinamou, Crypturellus cinnamomeus

Ducks, geese, and waterfowl
Order: AnseriformesFamily: Anatidae

Anatidae includes the ducks and most duck-like waterfowl such as geese and swans. These birds are adapted to an aquatic existence with webbed feet, flattened bills, and feathers that are excellent at shedding water due to an oily coating.

 Black-bellied whistling-duck, Dendrocygna autumnalis
 Fulvous whistling-duck, Dendrocygna bicolor (A)
 Snow goose, Anser caerulescens (A)
 Greater white-fronted goose, Anser albifrons (A)
 Canada goose, Branta canadensis (A)
 Muscovy duck, Cairina moschata
 Blue-winged teal, Spatula discors
 Cinnamon teal, Spatula cyanoptera
 Northern shoveler, Spatula clypeata
 Gadwall, Mareca strepera (A)
 American wigeon, Mareca americana
 Mallard, Anas platyrhynchos (A)
 Northern pintail, Anas acuta
 Green-winged teal, Anas crecca
 Redhead, Aythya americana (A)
 Ring-necked duck, Aythya collaris (A)
 Greater scaup, Aythya marila (A)
 Lesser scaup, Aythya affinis
 Hooded merganser, Lophodytes cucullatus (A)
 Red-breasted merganser, Mergus serrator (A)
 Masked duck, Nomonyx dominicus (A)
 Ruddy duck, Oxyura jamaicensis (A)

Guans, chachalacas, and curassows
Order: GalliformesFamily: Cracidae

The Cracidae are large birds, similar in general appearance to turkeys. The guans and curassows live in trees, but the smaller chachalacas are found in more open scrubby habitats. They are generally dull-plumaged, but the curassows and some guans have colorful facial ornaments.

 Plain chachalaca, Ortalis vetula
 Crested guan, Penelope purpurascens
 Great curassow, Crax rubra (Vulnerable)

New World quail
Order: GalliformesFamily: Odontophoridae

The New World quails are small, plump terrestrial birds only distantly related to the quails of the Old World, but named for their similar appearance and habits.

 Black-throated bobwhite, Colinus nigrogularis
 Singing quail, Dactylortyx thoracicus (A)
 Spotted wood-quail, Odontophorus guttatus

Pheasants, grouse, and allies
Order: GalliformesFamily: Phasianidae

Turkeys are similar to large pheasants but have a distinctive fleshy wattle that hangs from the beak, called a snood.

 Ocellated turkey, Meleagris ocellata (Near-threatened)

Flamingos
Order: PhoenicopteriformesFamily: Phoenicopteridae

Flamingos filter-feed on shellfish and algae. Their oddly shaped beaks are specially adapted to separate mud and silt from the food they consume and, uniquely, are used upside-down.

 American flamingo, Phoenicopterus ruber (A)

Grebes
Order: PodicipediformesFamily: Podicipedidae

Grebes are small to medium-large freshwater diving birds. They have lobed toes and are excellent swimmers and divers. However, they have their feet placed far back on the body, making them quite ungainly on land.

 Least grebe, Tachybaptus dominicus
 Pied-billed grebe, Podilymbus podiceps

Pigeons and doves
Order: ColumbiformesFamily: Columbidae

Pigeons and doves are stout-bodied birds with short necks and short slender bills with a fleshy cere.

 Rock pigeon, Columba livia (I)
 Pale-vented pigeon, Patagioenas cayennensis
 Scaled pigeon, Patagioenas speciosa
 White-crowned pigeon, Patagioenas leucocephala (Near-threatened)
 Red-billed pigeon, Patagioenas flavirostris
 Short-billed pigeon, Patagioenas nigrirostris
 Eurasian collared-dove, Streptopelia decaocto (I)
 Inca dove, Columbina inca (A)
 Common ground dove, Columbina passerina
 Plain-breasted ground dove, Columbina minuta
 Ruddy ground dove, Columbina talpacoti
 Blue ground dove, Claravis pretiosa
 Ruddy quail-dove, Geotrygon montana
 White-tipped dove, Leptotila verreauxi
 Caribbean dove, Leptotila jamaicensis
 Gray-chested dove, Leptotila cassinii
 Gray-headed dove, Leptotila plumbeiceps
 White-winged dove, Zenaida asiatica
 Mourning dove, Zenaida macroura

Cuckoos
Order: CuculiformesFamily: Cuculidae

The family Cuculidae includes cuckoos, roadrunners, and anis. These birds are of variable size with slender bodies, long tails, and strong legs. The Old World cuckoos are brood parasites.

 Smooth-billed ani, Crotophaga ani
 Groove-billed ani, Crotophaga sulcirostris
 Striped cuckoo, Tapera naevia
 Pheasant cuckoo, Dromococcyx phasianellus
 Squirrel cuckoo, Piaya cayana
 Dark-billed cuckoo, Coccyzus melacoryphus (A)
 Yellow-billed cuckoo, Coccyzus americanus
 Mangrove cuckoo, Coccyzus minor
 Black-billed cuckoo, Coccyzus erythropthalmus

Nightjars and allies
Order: CaprimulgiformesFamily: Caprimulgidae

Nightjars are medium-sized nocturnal birds that usually nest on the ground. They have long wings, short legs, and very short bills. Most have small feet, of little use for walking, and long pointed wings. Their soft plumage is camouflaged to resemble bark or leaves.

 Short-tailed nighthawk, Lurocalis semitorquatus (A)
 Lesser nighthawk, Chordeiles acutipennis
 Common nighthawk, Chordeiles minor
 Common pauraque, Nyctidromus albicollis
 Yucatan poorwill, Nyctiphrynus yucatanicus
 Chuck-will's-widow, Antrostomus carolinensis (Near-threatened)
 Yucatan nightjar, Antrostomus badius
 Eastern whip-poor-will, Antrostomus vociferus (Near-threatened)

Potoos
Order: NyctibiiformesFamily: Nyctibiidae

The potoos (sometimes called poor-me-ones) are large near passerine birds related to the nightjars and frogmouths. They are nocturnal insectivores which lack the bristles around the mouth found in the true nightjars.

 Great potoo, Nyctibius grandis
 Northern potoo, Nyctibius jamaicensis

Swifts
Order: ApodiformesFamily: Apodidae

Swifts are small birds which spend the majority of their lives flying. These birds have very short legs and never settle voluntarily on the ground, perching instead only on vertical surfaces. Many swifts have long swept-back wings which resemble a crescent or boomerang.

 Black swift, Cypseloides niger (A) (Vulnerable)
 White-chinned swift, Cypseloides cryptus (A)
 Chestnut-collared swift, Streptoprocne rutila
 White-collared swift, Streptoprocne zonaris
 Chimney swift, Chaetura pelagica (Vulnerable)
 Vaux's swift, Chaetura vauxi
 Lesser swallow-tailed swift, Panyptila cayennensis

Hummingbirds
Order: ApodiformesFamily: Trochilidae

Hummingbirds are small birds capable of hovering in mid-air due to the rapid flapping of their wings. They are the only birds that can fly backwards.

 White-necked jacobin, Florisuga mellivora
 Band-tailed barbthroat, Threnetes ruckeri
 Long-billed hermit, Phaethornis longirostris
 Stripe-throated hermit, Phaethornis striigularis
 Brown violetear, Colibri delphinae
 Purple-crowned fairy, Heliothryx barroti
 Green-breasted mango, Anthracothorax prevostii
 Black-crested coquette, Lophornis helenae
 Long-billed starthroat, Heliomaster longirostris
 Ruby-throated hummingbird, Archilochus colubris
 Canivet's Emerald, Cynanthus canivetii
 Wedge-tailed sabrewing, Pampa curvipennis
 Violet-headed hummingbird, Klais guimeti (A) 
 Violet sabrewing, Campylopterus hemileucurus
 Crowned woodnymph, Thalurania colombica
 Stripe-tailed hummingbird, Eupherusa eximia
 Scaly-breasted hummingbird, Phaeochroa cuvierii
 Azure-crowned hummingbird, Saucerottia cyanocephala
 Cinnamon hummingbird, Amazilia rutila
 Buff-bellied hummingbird, Amazilia yucatanensis
 Rufous-tailed hummingbird, Amazilia tzacatl
 White-bellied emerald, Chlorestes candida
 Blue-throated goldentail, Chlorestes eliciae (A)

Rails, gallinules and coots
Order: GruiformesFamily: Rallidae

Rallidae is a large family of small to medium-sized birds which includes the rails, crakes, coots, and gallinules. Typically they inhabit dense vegetation in damp environments near lakes, swamps, or rivers. In general they are shy and secretive birds, making them difficult to observe. Most species have strong legs and long toes which are well adapted to soft uneven surfaces. They tend to have short, rounded wings and to be weak fliers.

 Spotted rail, Pardirallus maculatus
 Uniform crake, Amaurolimnas concolor
 Rufous-necked wood-rail, Aramides axillaris
 Russet-naped wood-rail, Aramides albiventris
 Clapper rail, Rallus crepitans
 Sora, Porzana carolina
 Common gallinule, Gallinula galeata
 American coot, Fulica americana
 Purple gallinule, Porphyrio martinicus
 Yellow-breasted crake, Hapalocrex flaviventer
 Ruddy crake, Laterallus ruber
 Gray-breasted crake, Laterallus exilis
 Black rail, Laterallus jamaicensis (A)

Finfoots
Order: GruiformesFamily: Heliornithidae

Heliornithidae is a small family of tropical birds with webbed lobes on their feet similar to those of grebes and coots.

 Sungrebe, Heliornis fulica

Limpkin
Order: GruiformesFamily: Aramidae

The limpkin resembles a large rail. It has drab-brown plumage and a grayer head and neck.

 Limpkin, Aramus guarauna

Stilts and avocets
Order: CharadriiformesFamily: Recurvirostridae

Recurvirostridae is a family of large wading birds which includes the avocets and stilts. The avocets have long legs and long up-curved bills. The stilts have extremely long legs and long, thin, straight bills.

 Black-necked stilt, Himantopus mexicanus
 American avocet, Recurvirostra americana (A)

Oystercatchers
Order: CharadriiformesFamily: Haematopodidae

The oystercatchers are large and noisy plover-like birds, with strong bills used for smashing or prising open molluscs.

 American oystercatcher, Haematopus palliatus

Plovers and lapwings
Order: CharadriiformesFamily: Charadriidae

The family Charadriidae includes the plovers, dotterels, and lapwings. They are small to medium-sized birds with compact bodies, short thick necks, and long, usually pointed, wings. They are found in open country worldwide, mostly in habitats near water.

 Southern lapwing, Vanellus chilensis (A)
 Black-bellied plover, Pluvialis squatarola
 American golden-plover, Pluvialis dominica
 Killdeer, Charadrius vociferus
 Semipalmated plover, Charadrius semipalmatus
 Wilson's plover, Charadrius wilsonia
 Collared plover, Charadrius collaris (A)
 Snowy plover, Charadrius nivosus (Near-threatened)

Jacanas
Order: CharadriiformesFamily: Jacanidae

The jacanas are a family of waders which are found throughout the tropics. They are identifiable by their huge feet and claws which enable them to walk on floating vegetation in the shallow lakes that are their preferred habitat.

 Northern jacana, Jacana spinosa

Sandpipers and allies
Order: CharadriiformesFamily: Scolopacidae

Scolopacidae is a large diverse family of small to medium-sized shorebirds including the sandpipers, curlews, godwits, shanks, tattlers, woodcocks, snipes, dowitchers, and phalaropes. The majority of these species eat small invertebrates picked out of the mud or soil. Variation in length of legs and bills enables multiple species to feed in the same habitat, particularly on the coast, without direct competition for food.

 Upland sandpiper, Bartramia longicauda
 Whimbrel, Numenius phaeopus
 Long-billed curlew, Numenius americanus (Near-threatened)
 Hudsonian godwit, Limosa haemastica (A)
 Marbled godwit, Limosa fedoa (A)
 Ruddy turnstone, Arenaria interpres
 Red knot, Calidris canutus (Near-threatened)
 Ruff, Calidris pugnax (A)
 Stilt sandpiper, Calidris himantopus
 Sanderling, Calidris alba
 Dunlin, Calidris alpina
 Baird's sandpiper, Calidris bairdii (A)
 Least sandpiper, Calidris minutilla
 White-rumped sandpiper, Calidris fuscicollis
 Buff-breasted sandpiper, Calidris subruficollis (Near-threatened)
 Pectoral sandpiper, Calidris melanotos
 Semipalmated sandpiper, Calidris pusilla (Near-threatened)
 Western sandpiper, Calidris mauri
 Short-billed dowitcher, Limnodromus griseus
 Long-billed dowitcher, Limnodromus scolopaceus
 Wilson's snipe, Gallinago delicata
 Spotted sandpiper, Actitis macularia
 Solitary sandpiper, Tringa solitaria
 Lesser yellowlegs, Tringa flavipes
 Willet, Tringa semipalmata
 Greater yellowlegs, Tringa melanoleuca
 Wilson's phalarope, Phalaropus tricolor
 Red-necked phalarope, Phalaropus lobatus (A)

Skuas and jaegers
Order: CharadriiformesFamily: Stercorariidae

The family Stercorariidae are, in general, medium to large birds, typically with gray or brown plumage, often with white markings on the wings. They nest on the ground in temperate and arctic regions and are long-distance migrants.

 Great skua, Stercorarius skua (A)
 Pomarine jaeger, Stercorarius pomarinus
 Parasitic jaeger, Stercorarius parasiticus (A)

Gulls, terns, and skimmers
Order: CharadriiformesFamily: Laridae

Laridae is a family of medium to large seabirds and includes gulls, kittiwakes, terns, and skimmers. Gulls are typically gray or white, often with black markings on the head or wings. They have longish bills and webbed feet. Terns are a group of generally medium to large seabirds typically with grey or white plumage, often with black markings on the head. Most terns hunt fish by diving but some pick insects off the surface of fresh water. Terns are generally long-lived birds, with several species known to live in excess of 30 years. Skimmers are a small family of tropical tern-like birds. They have an elongated lower mandible which they use to feed by flying low over the water surface and skimming the water for small fish.

 Black-legged kittiwake, Rissa tridactyla (A)
 Bonaparte's gull, Chroicocephalus philadelphia (A)
 Laughing gull, Leucophaeus atricilla
 Franklin's gull, Leucophaeus pipixcan (A)
 Black-tailed gull, Larus crassirostris (A)
 Ring-billed gull, Larus delawarensis
 Herring gull, Larus argentatus
 Iceland Gull, Larus glaucoides (A)
 Lesser black-backed gull, Larus fuscus (A)
 Brown noddy, Anous stolidus
 Black noddy, Anous minutus (A)
 Sooty tern, Onychoprion fuscata
 Bridled tern, Onychoprion anaethetus
 Least tern, Sternula antillarum
 Gull-billed tern, Gelochelidon nilotica
 Caspian tern, Hydroprogne caspia
 Black tern, Chlidonias niger
 Roseate tern, Sterna dougallii
 Common tern, Sterna hirundo
 Arctic tern, Sterna paradisaea (A)
 Forster's tern, Sterna forsteri
 Royal tern, Thalasseus maxima
 Sandwich tern, Thalasseus sandvicensis
 Black skimmer, Rynchops niger

Tropicbirds
Order: PhaethontiformesFamily: Phaethontidae

Tropicbirds are slender white birds of tropical oceans with exceptionally long central tail feathers. Their heads and long wings have black markings.

 White-tailed tropicbird, Phaethon lepturus (A)

Albatrosses
Order: ProcellariiformesFamily: Diomedeidae

The albatrosses are amongst the largest of flying birds, and the great albatrosses from the genus Diomedea have the largest wingspans of any extant birds. 

Yellow-nosed albatross, Thalassarche chlororhynchos (A)

Southern storm-petrels
Order: ProcellariiformesFamily: Oceanitidae

The storm-petrels are the smallest seabirds, relatives of the petrels, feeding on planktonic crustaceans and small fish picked from the surface, typically while hovering. The flight is fluttering and sometimes bat-like. Until 2018, this family's three species were included with the other storm-petrels in family Hydrobatidae.

 Wilson's storm-petrel, Oceanites oceanicus (A)

Northern storm-petrels
Order: ProcellariiformesFamily: Hydrobatidae

Though the members of the family are similar in many respects to the southern storm-petrels, including their general appearance and habits, there are enough genetic differences to warrant their placement in a separate family.

 Band-rumped storm-petrel, Hydrobates castro (A)

Shearwaters and petrels
Order: ProcellariiformesFamily: Procellariidae

The procellariids are the main group of medium-sized "true petrels", characterized by united nostrils with medium septum and a long outer functional primary.

 Cory's shearwater, Calonectris diomedea (A)
 Great shearwater, Ardenna gravis (A)
 Manx shearwater, Puffinus puffinus (A)
 Audubon's shearwater, Puffinus lherminieri (A)

Storks
Order: CiconiiformesFamily: Ciconiidae

Storks are large, long-legged, long-necked wading birds with long, stout bills. Storks are mute, but bill-clattering is an important mode of communication at the nest. Their nests can be large and may be reused for many years. Many species are migratory.

 Jabiru, Jabiru mycteria
 Wood stork, Mycteria americana

Frigatebirds
Order: SuliformesFamily: Fregatidae

Frigatebirds are large seabirds usually found over tropical oceans. They are large, black-and-white, or completely black, with long wings and deeply forked tails. The males have colored inflatable throat pouches which are usually red. They do not swim or walk and cannot take off from a flat surface. Having the largest wingspan-to-body-weight ratio of any bird, they are essentially aerial, able to stay aloft for more than a week.

 Magnificent frigatebird, Fregata magnificens

Boobies and gannets
Order: SuliformesFamily: Sulidae

The sulids comprise the gannets and boobies. Both groups are medium to large coastal seabirds that plunge-dive for fish.

 Masked booby, Sula dactylatra (A)
 Brown booby, Sula leucogaster
 Red-footed booby, Sula sula

Anhingas
Order: SuliformesFamily: Anhingidae

Anhingas are often called "snake-birds" because of their long thin neck, which gives a snake-like appearance when they swim with their bodies submerged. The males have black and dark-brown plumage, an erectile crest on the nape, and a larger bill than the female. The females have much paler plumage especially on the neck and underparts. The anhingas have completely webbed feet and their legs are short and set far back on the body. Their plumage is somewhat permeable, like that of cormorants, and they spread their wings to dry after diving.

 Anhinga, Anhinga anhinga

Cormorants and shags
Order: SuliformesFamily: Phalacrocoracidae

Phalacrocoracidae is a family of medium to large coastal, fish-eating seabirds that includes cormorants and shags. Plumage coloration varies, with the majority having mainly dark plumage, some species being black-and-white, and a few being colorful.

 Double-crested cormorant, Nannopterum auritum
 Neotropic cormorant, Nannopterum brasilianum

Pelicans
Order: PelecaniformesFamily: Pelecanidae

Pelicans are large water birds with a distinctive pouch under their beak. As with other members of the order Pelecaniformes, they have webbed feet with four toes.

 American white pelican, Pelecanus erythrorhynchos
 Brown pelican, Pelecanus occidentalis

Herons, egrets, and bitterns
Order: PelecaniformesFamily: Ardeidae

The family Ardeidae contains the bitterns, herons, and egrets. Herons and egrets are medium to large wading birds with long necks and legs. Bitterns tend to be shorter necked and more wary. Members of Ardeidae fly with their necks retracted, unlike other long-necked birds such as storks, ibises, and spoonbills.

 Pinnated bittern, Botaurus pinnatus
 American bittern, Botaurus lentiginosus
 Least bittern, Ixobrychus exilis
 Bare-throated tiger-heron, Tigrisoma mexicanum
 Great blue heron, Ardea herodias
 Great egret, Ardea alba
 Snowy egret, Egretta thula
 Little blue heron, Egretta caerulea
 Tricolored heron, Egretta tricolor
 Reddish egret, Egretta rufescens (Near-threatened)
 Cattle egret, Bubulcus ibis
 Green heron, Butorides virescens
 Agami heron, Agamia agami (Vulnerable)
 Whistling heron, Syrigma sibilatrix (A)
 Black-crowned night-heron, Nycticorax nycticorax
 Yellow-crowned night-heron, Nyctanassa violacea
 Boat-billed heron, Cochlearius cochlearius

Ibises and spoonbills
Order: PelecaniformesFamily: Threskiornithidae

Threskiornithidae is a family of large terrestrial and wading birds which includes the ibises and spoonbills. They have long, broad wings with 11 primary and about 20 secondary feathers. They are strong fliers and despite their size and weight, very capable soarers.

 White ibis, Eudocimus albus
 Scarlet ibis, Eudocimus ruber (A)
 Glossy ibis, Plegadis falcinellus
 White-faced ibis, Plegadis chihi (A)
 Roseate spoonbill, Platalea ajaja

New World vultures
Order: CathartiformesFamily: Cathartidae

The New World vultures are not closely related to Old World vultures, but superficially resemble them because of convergent evolution. Like the Old World vultures, they are scavengers. However, unlike Old World vultures, which find carcasses by sight, New World vultures have a good sense of smell with which they locate carrion.

 King vulture, Sarcoramphus papa
 Black vulture, Coragyps atratus
 Turkey vulture, Cathartes aura
 Lesser yellow-headed vulture, Cathartes burrovianus

Osprey
Order: AccipitriformesFamily: Pandionidae

The family Pandionidae contains only one species, the osprey. The osprey is a medium-large raptor which is a specialist fish-eater with a worldwide distribution.

 Osprey, Pandion haliaetus

Hawks, eagles, and kites
Order: AccipitriformesFamily: Accipitridae

Accipitridae is a family of birds of prey which includes hawks, eagles, kites, harriers, and Old World vultures. These birds have powerful hooked beaks for tearing flesh from their prey, strong legs, powerful talons, and keen eyesight.

 White-tailed kite, Elanus leucurus
 Hook-billed kite, Chondrohierax uncinatus
 Gray-headed kite, Leptodon cayanensis
 Swallow-tailed kite, Elanoides forficatus
 Crested eagle, Morphnus guianensis (Near-threatened)
 Harpy eagle, Harpia harpyja (Near-threatened)
 Black hawk-eagle, Spizaetus tyrannus
 Black-and-white hawk-eagle, Spizaetus melanoleucus
 Ornate hawk-eagle, Spizaetus ornatus (Near-threatened)
 Double-toothed kite, Harpagus bidentatus
 Northern harrier, Circus hudsonius
 Sharp-shinned hawk, Accipiter striatus
 Cooper's hawk, Accipiter cooperii
 Bicolored hawk, Accipiter bicolor
 Bald eagle, Haliaeetus leucocephalus (A)
 Mississippi kite, Ictinia mississippiensis
 Plumbeous kite, Ictinia plumbea
 Black-collared hawk, Busarellus nigricollis
 Crane hawk, Geranospiza caerulescens
 Snail kite, Rostrhamus sociabilis
 Common black hawk, Buteogallus anthracinus
 Great black hawk, Buteogallus urubitinga
 Solitary eagle, Buteogallus solitarius (Near-threatened)
 Roadside hawk, Rupornis magnirostris
 White-tailed hawk, Geranoaetus albicaudatus
 White hawk, Pseudastur albicollis
 Gray hawk, Buteo plagiatus
 Broad-winged hawk, Buteo platypterus
 Short-tailed hawk, Buteo brachyurus
 Swainson's hawk, Buteo swainsoni
 Zone-tailed hawk, Buteo albonotatus
 Red-tailed hawk, Buteo jamaicensis

Barn-owls
Order: StrigiformesFamily: Tytonidae

Barn-owls are medium to large owls with large heads and characteristic heart-shaped faces. They have long strong legs with powerful talons.

 Barn owl, Tyto alba

Owls
Order: StrigiformesFamily: Strigidae

The typical owls are small to large solitary nocturnal birds of prey. They have large forward-facing eyes and ears, a hawk-like beak, and a conspicuous circle of feathers around each eye called a facial disk.

 Middle-American screech-owl, Megascops guatemalae
 Crested owl, Lophostrix cristata
 Spectacled owl, Pulsatrix perspicillata
 Great horned owl, Bubo virginianus
 Central American pygmy-owl, Glaucidium griseiceps
 Ferruginous pygmy-owl, Glaucidium brasilianum
 Burrowing owl, Athene cunicularia
 Mottled owl, Strix virgata
 Black-and-white owl, Strix nigrolineata
 Stygian owl, Asio stygius
 Short-eared owl, Asio flammeus (A)
 Striped owl, Asio clamator

Trogons
Order: TrogoniformesFamily: Trogonidae

The family Trogonidae includes trogons and quetzals. Found in tropical woodlands worldwide, they feed on insects and fruit, and their broad bills and weak legs reflect their diet and arboreal habits. Although their flight is fast, they are reluctant to fly any distance. Trogons have soft, often colorful, feathers with distinctive male and female plumage.

 Slaty-tailed trogon, Trogon massena
 Black-headed trogon, Trogon melanocephalus
 Gartered trogon, Trogon caligatus
 Collared trogon, Trogon collaris

Motmots
Order: CoraciiformesFamily: Momotidae

The motmots have colorful plumage and long, graduated tails which they display by waggling back and forth. In most of the species, the barbs near the ends of the two longest (central) tail feathers are weak and fall off, leaving a length of bare shaft and creating a racket-shaped tail.

 Tody motmot, Hylomanes momotula
 Lesson's motmot, Momotus lessonii
 Keel-billed motmot, Electron carinatum (Vulnerable)

Kingfishers
Order: CoraciiformesFamily: Alcedinidae

Kingfishers are medium-sized birds with large heads, long, pointed bills, short legs, and stubby tails.

 Ringed kingfisher, Megaceryle torquatus
 Belted kingfisher, Megaceryle alcyon
 Amazon kingfisher, Chloroceryle amazona
 American pygmy kingfisher, Chloroceryle aenea
 Green kingfisher, Chloroceryle americana

Puffbirds
Order: PiciformesFamily: Bucconidae

The puffbirds are related to the jacamars and have the same range, but lack the iridescent colors of that family. They are mainly brown, rufous, or gray, with large heads and flattened bills with hooked tips. The loose abundant plumage and short tails makes them look stout and puffy, giving rise to the English common name of the family.

 White-necked puffbird, Notharchus hyperrhynchus
 White-whiskered puffbird, Malacoptila panamensis

Jacamars
Order: PiciformesFamily: Galbulidae

The jacamars are near passerine birds from tropical South America with a range that extends up to Mexico. They feed on insects caught on the wing, and are glossy, elegant birds with long bills and tails. In appearance and behavior they resemble the Old World bee-eaters, although they are more closely related to puffbirds.

 Rufous-tailed jacamar, Galbula ruficauda

Toucans
Order: PiciformesFamily: Ramphastidae

Toucans are near passerine birds from the Neotropics. They are brightly marked and have enormous, colorful bills which in some species amount to half their body length. The keel-billed toucan is the National Bird.

 Northern emerald-toucanet, Aulacorhynchus prasinus
 Collared aracari, Pteroglossus torquatus
 Keel-billed toucan, Ramphastos sulfuratus

Woodpeckers
Order: PiciformesFamily: Picidae

Woodpeckers are small to medium-sized birds with chisel-like beaks, short legs, stiff tails, and long tongues used for capturing insects. Some species have feet with two toes pointing forward and two backward, while several species have only three toes. Many woodpeckers have the habit of tapping noisily on tree trunks with their beaks.

 Acorn woodpecker, Melanerpes formicivorus
 Black-cheeked woodpecker, Melanerpes pucherani
 Yucatan woodpecker, Melanerpes pygmaeus
 Golden-fronted woodpecker, Melanerpes aurifrons
 Yellow-bellied sapsucker, Sphyrapicus varius
 Ladder-backed woodpecker, Dryobates scalaris
 Smoky-brown woodpecker, Dryobates fumigatus
 Golden-olive woodpecker, Colaptes rubiginosus
 Chestnut-colored woodpecker, Celeus castaneus
 Lineated woodpecker, Dryocopus lineatus
 Pale-billed woodpecker, Campephilus guatemalensis

Falcons and caracaras
Order: FalconiformesFamily: Falconidae

Falconidae is a family of diurnal birds of prey. They differ from hawks, eagles and kites in that they kill with their beaks instead of their talons.

 Laughing falcon, Herpetotheres cachinnans
 Barred forest-falcon, Micrastur ruficollis
 Collared forest-falcon, Micrastur semitorquatus
 Crested caracara, Caracara plancus
 American kestrel, Falco sparverius
 Merlin, Falco columbarius
 Aplomado falcon, Falco femoralis
 Bat falcon, Falco rufigularis
 Orange-breasted falcon, Falco deiroleucus (Near-threatened)
 Peregrine falcon, Falco peregrinus

New World and African parrots
Order: PsittaciformesFamily: Psittacidae

Parrots are small to large birds with a characteristic curved beak. Their upper mandibles have slight mobility in the joint with the skull and they have a generally erect stance. All parrots are zygodactyl, having the four toes on each foot placed two at the front and two to the back.

 Olive-throated parakeet, Eupsittula nana
 Scarlet macaw, Ara macao
 Green parakeet, Psittacara holochlorus (A)
 Brown-hooded parrot, Pyrilia haematotis
 White-crowned parrot, Pionus senilis
 White-fronted parrot, Amazona albifrons
 Yellow-lored parrot, Amazona xantholora
 Red-lored parrot, Amazona autumnalis
 Mealy parrot, Amazona farinosa
 Yellow-headed parrot, Amazona oratrix (Endangered)
 Yellow-naped parrot, Amazona auropalliata (A) (Vulnerable)

Manakins
Order: PasseriformesFamily: Pipridae

The manakins are a family of subtropical and tropical mainland Central and South America, and Trinidad and Tobago. They are compact forest birds, the males typically being brightly colored, although the females of most species are duller and usually green-plumaged. Manakins feed on small fruits, berries, and insects.

 White-collared manakin, Manacus candei
 Red-capped manakin, Ceratopipra mentalis

Cotingas
Order: PasseriformesFamily: Cotingidae

The cotingas are birds of forests or forest edges in tropical South America. Comparatively little is known about this diverse group, although all have broad bills with hooked tips, rounded wings, and strong legs. The males of many of the species are brightly colored or decorated with plumes or wattles.

 Lovely cotinga, Cotinga amabilis
 Rufous piha, Lipaugus unirufus

Tityras and allies
Order: PasseriformesFamily: Tityridae

Tityridae is family of suboscine passerine birds found in forest and woodland in the Neotropics. The approximately 30 species in this family were formerly lumped with the families Pipridae and Cotingidae (see Taxonomy).

 Northern schiffornis, Schiffornis veraepacis
 Speckled mourner, Laniocera rufescens
 Masked tityra, Tityra semifasciata
 Black-crowned tityra, Tityra inquisitor
 Cinnamon becard, Pachyramphus cinnamomeus
 White-winged becard, Pachyramphus polychopterus
 Gray-collared becard, Pachyramphus major
 Rose-throated becard, Pachyramphus aglaiae

Royal flycatcher and allies
Order: PasseriformesFamily: Onychorhynchidae

The members of this small family, created in 2018, were formerly considered to be tyrant flycatchers, family Tyrannidae.

 Royal flycatcher, Onychorhynchus coronatus
 Ruddy-tailed flycatcher, Terenotriccus erythrurus
 Sulphur-rumped flycatcher, Myiobius sulphureipygius

Tyrant flycatchers
Order: PasseriformesFamily: Tyrannidae

Tyrant flycatchers are passerine birds which occur throughout North and South America. They superficially resemble the Old World flycatchers, but are more robust and have stronger bills. They do not have the sophisticated vocal capabilities of the songbirds. Most, but not all, have plain coloring. As the name implies, most are insectivorous.

 Stub-tailed spadebill, Platyrinchus cancrominus
 Ochre-bellied flycatcher, Mionectes oleagineus
 Sepia-capped flycatcher, Leptopogon amaurocephalus
 Northern bentbill, Oncostoma cinereigulare
 Slate-headed tody-flycatcher, Poecilotriccus sylvia
 Common tody-flycatcher, Todirostrum cinereum
 Eye-ringed flatbill, Rhynchocyclus brevirostris
 Yellow-olive flycatcher, Tolmomyias sulphurescens
 Yellow-bellied tyrannulet, Ornithion semiflavum
 Northern beardless-tyrannulet, Camptostoma imberbe
 Greenish elaenia, Myiopagis viridicata
 Caribbean elaenia, Elaenia martinica (A)
 Yellow-bellied elaenia, Elaenia flavogaster
 Guatemalan tyrannulet, Zimmerius vilissimus (A)
 Mistletoe tyrannulet, Zimmerius parvus
 Bright-rumped attila, Attila spadiceus
 Rufous mourner, Rhytipterna holerythra
 Yucatan flycatcher, Myiarchus yucatanensis
 Dusky-capped flycatcher, Myiarchus tuberculifer
 Great crested flycatcher, Myiarchus crinitus
 Brown-crested flycatcher, Myiarchus tyrannulus
 Great kiskadee, Pitangus sulphuratus
 Boat-billed flycatcher, Megarynchus pitangua
 Social flycatcher, Myiozetetes similis
 Streaked flycatcher, Myiodynastes maculatus
 Sulphur-bellied flycatcher, Myiodynastes luteiventris
 Piratic flycatcher, Legatus leucophaius
 Tropical kingbird, Tyrannus melancholicus
 Couch's kingbird, Tyrannus couchii
 Cassin's kingbird, Tyrannus vociferans (A)
 Western kingbird, Tyrannus verticalis
 Eastern kingbird, Tyrannus tyrannus
 Gray kingbird, Tyrannus dominicensis
 Scissor-tailed flycatcher, Tyrannus forficatus
 Fork-tailed flycatcher, Tyrannus savana
 Olive-sided flycatcher, Contopus cooperi (Near-threatened)
 Greater pewee, Contopus pertinax
 Western wood-pewee, Contopus sordidulus (A)
 Eastern wood-pewee, Contopus virens
 Tropical pewee, Contopus cinereus
 Yellow-bellied flycatcher, Empidonax flaviventris
 Acadian flycatcher, Empidonax virescens
 Alder flycatcher, Empidonax alnorum
 Willow flycatcher, Empidonax traillii
 White-throated flycatcher, Empidonax albigularis
 Least flycatcher, Empidonax minimus
 Black phoebe, Sayornis nigricans
 Eastern phoebe, Sayornis phoebe (A)
 Vermilion flycatcher, Pyrocephalus rubinus

Typical antbirds
Order: PasseriformesFamily: Thamnophilidae

The antbirds are a large family of small passerine birds of subtropical and tropical Central and South America. They are forest birds which tend to feed on insects at or near the ground. A sizable minority of them specialize in following columns of army ants to eat small invertebrates that leave their hiding places to flee from the ants. Many species lack bright color with brown, black, and white being the dominant tones.

 Great antshrike, Taraba major
 Barred antshrike, Thamnophilus doliatus
 Black-crowned antshrike, Thamnophilus atrinucha
 Russet antshrike, Thamnistes anabatinus
 Plain antvireo, Dysithamnus mentalis
 Slaty antwren, Myrmotherula schisticolor
 Dot-winged antwren, Microrhopias quixensis
 Dusky antbird, Cercomacroides tyrannina
 Bare-crowned antbird, Gymnocichla nudiceps

Antthrushes
Order: PasseriformesFamily: Formicariidae
Antthrushes resemble small rails with strong, longish legs, very short tails, and stout bills.

 Mayan antthrush, Formicarius moniliger

Ovenbirds and woodcreepers
Order: PasseriformesFamily: Furnariidae

Ovenbirds comprise a large family of small sub-oscine passerine bird species found in Central and South America. They are a diverse group of insectivores which gets its name from the elaborate "oven-like" clay nests built by some species, although others build stick nests or nest in tunnels or clefts in rock. The woodcreepers are brownish birds which maintain an upright vertical posture, supported by their stiff tail vanes. They feed mainly on insects taken from tree trunks.

 Middle American leaftosser, Sclerurus mexicanus
 Scaly-throated leaftosser, Sclerurus guatemalensis
 Olivaceous woodcreeper, Sittasomus griseicapillus
 Ruddy woodcreeper, Dendrocincla homochroa
 Tawny-winged woodcreeper, Dendrocincla anabatina
 Wedge-billed woodcreeper, Glyphorynchus spirurus
 Northern barred-woodcreeper, Dendrocolaptes sanctithomae
 Strong-billed woodcreeper, Xiphocolaptes promeropirhynchus
 Ivory-billed woodcreeper, Xiphorhynchus flavigaster
 Spotted woodcreeper, Xiphorhynchus erythropygius
 Streak-headed woodcreeper, Lepidocolaptes souleyetii
 Plain xenops, Xenops minutus
 Scaly-throated foliage-gleaner, Anabacerthia variegaticeps (A)
 Buff-throated foliage-gleaner, Automolus ochrolaemus
 Rufous-breasted spinetail, Synallaxis erythrothorax

Vireos, shrike-babblers, and erpornis
Order: PasseriformesFamily: Vireonidae

The vireos are a group of small to medium-sized passerine birds. They are typically greenish in color and resemble wood-warblers apart from their heavier bills.

 Rufous-browed peppershrike, Cyclarhis gujanensis
 Green shrike-vireo, Vireolanius pulchellus
 Tawny-crowned greenlet, Tunchiornis ochraceiceps
 Lesser greenlet, Pachysylvia decurtata
 White-eyed vireo, Vireo griseus
 Mangrove vireo, Vireo pallens
 Bell's vireo, Vireo bellii (A)
 Yellow-throated vireo, Vireo flavifrons
 Blue-headed vireo, Vireo solitarius
 Plumbeous vireo, Vireo plumbeus
 Philadelphia vireo, Vireo philadelphicus
 Warbling vireo, Vireo gilvus (A)
 Red-eyed vireo, Vireo olivaceus
 Yellow-green vireo, Vireo flavoviridis
 Black-whiskered vireo, Vireo altiloquus (A)
 Yucatan vireo, Vireo magister

Crows, jays, and magpies
Order: PasseriformesFamily: Corvidae

The family Corvidae includes crows, ravens, jays, choughs, magpies, treepies, nutcrackers, and ground jays. Corvids are above average in size among the Passeriformes, and some of the larger species show high levels of intelligence.

 Brown jay, Psilorhinus morio
 Green jay, Cyanocorax yncas
 Yucatan jay, Cyanocorax yucatanicus

Swallows
Order: PasseriformesFamily: Hirundinidae

The family Hirundinidae is adapted to aerial feeding. They have a slender streamlined body, long pointed wings, and a short bill with a wide gape. The feet are adapted to perching rather than walking, and the front toes are partially joined at the base.

 Bank swallow, Riparia riparia
 Tree swallow, Tachycineta bicolor
 Violet-green swallow, Tachycineta thalassina (A)
 Mangrove swallow, Tachycineta albilinea
 Northern rough-winged swallow, Stelgidopteryx serripennis
 Brown-chested martin, Progne tapera (A)
 Purple martin, Progne subis
 Gray-breasted martin, Progne chalybea
 Sinaloa martin, Progne sinaloae (A) (Vulnerable)
 Barn swallow, Hirundo rustica
 Cliff swallow, Petrochelidon pyrrhonota
 Cave swallow, Petrochelidon fulva

Kinglets
Order: PasseriformesFamily: Regulidae

The kinglets and "crests" are a small family of birds which resemble some warblers. They are very small insectivorous birds. The adults have colored crowns, giving rise to their name.

 Ruby-crowned kinglet, Corthylio calendula (A)

Waxwings
Order: PasseriformesFamily: Bombycillidae

The waxwings are a group of birds with soft silky plumage and unique red tips to some of the wing feathers. In the Bohemian and cedar waxwings, these tips look like sealing wax and give the group its name. These are arboreal birds of northern forests. They live on insects in summer and berries in winter.

 Cedar waxwing, Bombycilla cedrorum

Gnatcatchers
Order: PasseriformesFamily: Polioptilidae

These dainty birds resemble Old World warblers in their build and habits, moving restlessly through the foliage seeking insects. The gnatcatchers and gnatwrens are mainly soft bluish gray in color and have the typical insectivore's long sharp bill. They are birds of fairly open woodland or scrub, which nest in bushes or trees.

 Long-billed gnatwren, Ramphocaenus melanurus
 White-browed gnatcatcher, Polioptila bilineata
 Blue-gray gnatcatcher, Polioptila caerulea

Wrens
Order: PasseriformesFamily: Troglodytidae

The wrens are mainly small and inconspicuous except for their loud songs. These birds have short wings and thin down-turned bills. Several species often hold their tails upright. All are insectivorous.

 Nightingale wren, Microcerculus philomela
 House wren, Troglodytes aedon
 Grass wren, Cistothorus platensis
 Carolina wren, Thryothorus ludovicianus
 Band-backed wren, Campylorhynchus zonatus
 Spot-breasted wren, Pheugopedius maculipectus
 Cabanis's wren, Cantorchilus modestus
 White-bellied wren, Uropsila leucogastra
 White-breasted wood-wren, Henicorhina leucosticta
 Gray-breasted wood-wren, Henicorhina leucophrys (A)

Mockingbirds and thrashers
Order: PasseriformesFamily: Mimidae

The mimids are a family of passerine birds that includes thrashers, mockingbirds, tremblers, and the New World catbirds. These birds are notable for their vocalizations, especially their ability to mimic a wide variety of birds and other sounds heard outdoors. Their coloring tends towards dull grays and browns.

 Black catbird, Melanoptila glabrirostris (Near-threatened)
 Gray catbird, Dumetella carolinensis
 Tropical mockingbird, Mimus gilvus
 Northern mockingbird, Mimus polyglottos (A)

Thrushes and allies
Order: PasseriformesFamily: Turdidae

The thrushes are a group of passerine birds that occur mainly in the Old World. They are plump, soft plumaged, small to medium-sized insectivores or sometimes omnivores, often feeding on the ground.

 Eastern bluebird, Sialia sialis
 Slate-colored solitaire, Myadestes unicolor
 Veery, Catharus fuscescens
 Gray-cheeked thrush, Catharus minimus
 Swainson's thrush, Catharus ustulatus
 Hermit thrush, Catharus guttatus (A)
 Wood thrush, Hylocichla mustelina (Near-threatened)
 Clay-colored thrush, Turdus grayi
 White-throated thrush, Turdus assimilis
 American robin, Turdus migratorius (A)

Waxbills and allies
Order: PasseriformesFamily: Estrildidae

The members of this family are small passerine birds native to the Old World tropics. They are gregarious and often colonial seed eaters with short thick but pointed bills. They are all similar in structure and habits, but have wide variation in plumage colors and patterns.

 Tricolored munia, Lonchura malacca (I)

Old World sparrows
Order: PasseriformesFamily: Passeridae

Sparrows are small passerine birds. In general, sparrows tend to be small, plump, brown or gray birds with short tails and short powerful beaks. Sparrows are seed eaters, but they also consume small insects.

 House sparrow, Passer domesticus (I)

Wagtails and pipits
Order: PasseriformesFamily: Motacillidae

Motacillidae is a family of small passerine birds with medium to long tails. They include the wagtails, longclaws, and pipits. They are slender ground-feeding insectivores of open country.

 American pipit, Anthus rubescens

Finches, euphonias, and allies
Order: PasseriformesFamily: Fringillidae

Finches are seed-eating passerine birds, that are small to moderately large and have a strong beak, usually conical and in some species very large. All have twelve tail feathers and nine primaries. These birds have a bouncing flight with alternating bouts of flapping and gliding on closed wings, and most sing well.

 Elegant euphonia, Chlorophonia elegantissima (A)
 Scrub euphonia, Euphonia affinis
 White-vented euphonia, Euphonia minuta (A)
 Yellow-throated euphonia, Euphonia hirundinacea
 Olive-backed euphonia, Euphonia gouldi
 Red crossbill, Loxia curvirostra
 Black-headed siskin, Spinus notatus
 Lesser goldfinch, Spinus psaltria

New World sparrows
Order: PasseriformesFamily: Passerellidae

Until 2017, these species were considered part of the family Emberizidae. Most of the species are known as sparrows, but these birds are not closely related to the Old World sparrows which are in the family Passeridae. Many of these have distinctive head patterns.

 Common chlorospingus, Chlorospingus flavopectus
 Botteri's sparrow, Peucaea botterii
 Grasshopper sparrow, Ammodramus savannarum
 Olive sparrow, Arremonops rufivirgatus
 Green-backed sparrow, Arremonops chloronotus
 Lark sparrow, Chondestes grammacus (A)
 Chipping sparrow, Spizella passerina
 Clay-colored sparrow, Spizella pallida (A)
 Orange-billed sparrow, Arremon aurantiirostris
 White-crowned sparrow, Zonotrichia leucophrys (A)
 White-throated sparrow, Zonotrichia albicollis (A)
 Vesper sparrow, Pooecetes gramineus (A)
 Savannah sparrow, Passerculus sandwichensis
 Lincoln's sparrow, Melospiza lincolnii
 White-faced ground-sparrow, Melozone biarcuata (A)
 Rusty sparrow, Aimophila rufescens

Yellow-breasted chat
Order: PasseriformesFamily: Icteriidae

This species was historically placed in the wood-warblers (Parulidae) but nonetheless most authorities were unsure if it belonged there. It was placed in its own family in 2017.

 Yellow-breasted chat, Icteria virens

Troupials and allies
Order: PasseriformesFamily: Icteridae

The icterids are a group of small to medium-sized, often colorful, passerine birds restricted to the New World and include the grackles, New World blackbirds, and New World orioles. Most species have black as the predominant plumage color, often enlivened by yellow, orange, or red.

 Yellow-headed blackbird,  Xanthocephalus xanthocephalus (A)
 Bobolink, Dolichonyx oryzivorus
 Eastern meadowlark, Sturnella magna (Near-threatened)
 Yellow-billed cacique, Amblycercus holosericeus
 Yellow-winged cacique, Cassiculus melanicterus (A)
 Chestnut-headed oropendola, Psarocolius wagleri
 Montezuma oropendola, Psarocolius montezuma
 Black-cowled oriole, Icterus prosthemelas
 Orchard oriole, Icterus spurius
 Hooded oriole, Icterus cucullatus
 Yellow-backed oriole, Icterus chrysater
 Yellow-tailed oriole, Icterus mesomelas
 Bullock's oriole, Icterus bullockii (A)
 Orange oriole, Icterus auratus
 Spot-breasted oriole, Icterus pectoralis
 Altamira oriole, Icterus gularis
 Baltimore oriole, Icterus galbula
 Red-winged blackbird, Agelaius phoeniceus
 Shiny cowbird, Molothrus bonariensis (A)
 Bronzed cowbird, Molothrus aeneus
 Brown-headed cowbird, Molothrus ater (A)
 Giant cowbird, Molothrus oryzivorus
 Melodious blackbird, Dives dives
 Great-tailed grackle, Quiscalus mexicanus

New World warblers
Order: PasseriformesFamily: Parulidae
The wood-warblers are a group of small, often colorful, passerine birds restricted to the New World. Most are arboreal, but some are terrestrial. Most members of this family are insectivores.

 Ovenbird, Seiurus aurocapilla
 Worm-eating warbler, Helmitheros vermivorus
 Louisiana waterthrush, Parkesia motacilla
 Northern waterthrush, Parkesia noveboracensis
 Golden-winged warbler, Vermivora chrysoptera (Near-threatened)
 Blue-winged warbler, Vermivora cyanoptera
 Black-and-white warbler, Mniotilta varia
 Prothonotary warbler, Protonotaria citrea
 Swainson's warbler, Limnothlypis swainsonii
 Tennessee warbler, Leiothlypis peregrina
 Orange-crowned warbler, Leiothlypis celata (A)
 Nashville warbler, Leiothlypis ruficapilla
 Virginia's warbler, Leiothlypis virginiae (A)
 Connecticut warbler, Oporornis agilis (A)
 Gray-crowned yellowthroat, Geothlypis poliocephala
 MacGillivray's warbler, Geothlypis tolmiei (A)
 Mourning warbler, Geothlypis philadelphia
 Kentucky warbler, Geothlypis formosa
 Common yellowthroat, Geothlypis trichas
 Hooded warbler, Setophaga citrina
 American redstart, Setophaga ruticilla
 Cape May warbler, Setophaga tigrina
 Cerulean warbler, Setophaga cerulea (Vulnerable)
 Northern parula, Setophaga americana
 Tropical parula, Setophaga pitiayumi (A)
 Magnolia warbler, Setophaga magnolia
 Bay-breasted warbler, Setophaga castanea
 Blackburnian warbler, Setophaga fusca
 Yellow warbler, Setophaga petechia
 Chestnut-sided warbler, Setophaga pensylvanica
 Blackpoll warbler, Setophaga striata (Near-threatened)
 Black-throated blue warbler, Setophaga caerulescens
 Palm warbler, Setophaga palmarum
 Yellow-rumped warbler, Setophaga coronata
 Yellow-throated warbler, Setophaga dominica
 Prairie warbler, Setophaga discolor
 Grace's warbler, Setophaga graciae
 Black-throated gray warbler, Setophaga nigrescens (A)
 Townsend's warbler, Setophaga townsendi (A)
 Hermit warbler, Setophaga occidentalis (A)
 Golden-cheeked warbler, Setophaga chrysoparia (A) (Endangered)
 Black-throated green warbler, Setophaga virens
 Rufous-capped warbler, Basileuterus rufifrons
 Chestnut-capped warbler, Basileuterus delattrii
 Golden-crowned warbler, Basileuterus culicivorus
 Canada warbler, Cardellina canadensis
 Wilson's warbler, Cardellina pusilla

Cardinals and allies
Order: PasseriformesFamily: Cardinalidae

The cardinals are a family of robust, seed-eating birds with strong bills. They are typically associated with open woodland. The sexes usually have distinct plumages.

 Rose-throated tanager, Piranga roseogularis
 Hepatic tanager, Piranga flava
 Summer tanager, Piranga rubra
 Scarlet tanager, Piranga olivacea
 Western tanager, Piranga ludoviciana
 Flame-colored tanager, Piranga bidentata (A)
 White-winged tanager, Piranga leucoptera
 Red-crowned ant-tanager, Habia rubica
 Red-throated ant-tanager, Habia fuscicauda
 Black-faced grosbeak, Caryothraustes poliogaster
 Northern cardinal, Cardinalis cardinalis
 Rose-breasted grosbeak, Pheucticus ludovicianus
 Black-headed grosbeak, Pheucticus melanocephalus (A)
 Gray-throated chat, Granatellus sallaei
 Blue seedeater, Amaurospiza concolor
 Blue-black grosbeak, Cyanoloxia cyanoides
 Blue bunting, Cyanocompsa parellina
 Blue grosbeak, Passerina caerulea
 Lazuli bunting, Passerina amoena (A)
 Indigo bunting, Passerina cyanea
 Painted bunting, Passerina ciris (Near-threatened)
 Dickcissel, Spiza americana

Tanagers and allies
Order: PasseriformesFamily: Thraupidae

The tanagers are a large group of small to medium-sized passerine birds restricted to the New World, mainly in the tropics. Many species are brightly colored. As a family they are omnivorous, but individual species specialize in eating fruits, seeds, insects, or other types of food. Most have short, rounded wings.

 Golden-hooded tanager, Stilpnia larvata
 Blue-gray tanager, Thraupis episcopus
 Yellow-winged tanager, Thraupis abbas
 Grassland yellow-finch, Sicalis luteola
 Green honeycreeper, Chlorophanes spiza
 Blue-black grassquit, Volatinia jacarina
 Gray-headed tanager, Eucometis penicillata
 Black-throated shrike-tanager, Lanio aurantius
 Crimson-collared tanager, Ramphocelus sanguinolentus
 Scarlet-rumped tanager, Ramphocelus passerinii
 Shining honeycreeper, Cyanerpes lucidus
 Red-legged honeycreeper, Cyanerpes cyaneus
 Bananaquit, Coereba flaveola
 Yellow-faced grassquit, Tiaris olivaceus (A)
 Thick-billed seed-finch, Oryzoborus funereus
 Variable seedeater, Sporophila corvina
 Slate-colored seedeater, Sporophila schistacea
 Morelet's seedeater, Sporophila morelleti
 Black-headed saltator, Saltator atriceps
 Buff-throated saltator, Saltator maximus
 Cinnamon-bellied saltator, Saltator grandis

See also
 Fauna of Belize
 List of birds
 Lists of birds by region

References

External links
 Birds of Belize - World Institute for Conservation and Environment

Further reading
 

'
Belize
birds